Robert M. Whaples (born 1961 in Augsburg, West Germany) is a professor of economics at Wake Forest University. He is also the co-editor of the Independent Review.

Education
Whaples graduated from the University of Maryland in 1983 with B.A.'s in economics and history, and received his Ph.D. in 1990 from the University of Pennsylvania. His Ph.D. thesis, "The Shortening of the American Work Week: An Economic and Historical Analysis", won the Allan Nevins Prize from the Economic History Association.

Career
Whaples began teaching at the University of Wisconsin-Milwaukee in 1988.  He moved to Wake Forest University in 1991, and was chair of the economics department there from 2006 to 2013. He has served as book review editor of EH.Net since 1996 and was director of EH.Net from 2003 to 2008. He has argued that the United States penny should be eliminated, an argument he has supported with a study he conducted regarding the effects of eliminating the penny on prices. In 1995, he conducted a survey of economists regarding the effects of Franklin D. Roosevelt's New Deal policies on the Great Depression, and found that they were almost evenly split regarding whether his policies "served to lengthen and deepen" the Great Depression.

Personal life
He and his wife, Regina, have five children (two sons and three daughters).

Surveys

References

Living people
1961 births
German emigrants to the United States
21st-century American economists
Wake Forest University faculty
University of Maryland, College Park alumni
University of Pennsylvania alumni
William Jessup University alumni